State Route 411 (SR 411) is a  state highway located in Cowlitz County in the U.S. state of Washington, serving Longview, Kelso, West Side Highway and Castle Rock. In 1991, the highway was extended south to SR 432 in Longview, the former route becoming SR 411 Spur, and was shortened to I-5 / I-5 Business / SR 504 in Castle Rock.

Route description
After passing the community of West Side Highway, the highway turns east as PH No. 10 Road and crosses the Cowlitz River into Castle Rock. The busiest segments of the road in 2007 were the SR 432 interchange in Longview, SR 411 Spur intersection in Kelso and the Alpha Drive intersection in West Side Highway, all with an estimated daily average of 17,000 motorists. The Nevada Drive junction in Kelso was the busiest segment in 1970, with an estimated daily average of 6,800 motorists.

History
The current route of SR 411 first appeared on a United States Geological Survey (USGS) map of Southwest Washington in 1951. (SSH 12H) was established in 1957 and ran from Kelso to Vader.

Former Castle Rock—Vader route (1964—1991)
Between 1964 and 1991, SR 411 was  longer and extended north to Vader, a city in Lewis County. Between Castle Rock and Vader, six different railroads have had ownership or usage rights that paralleled the former route. In the 1870s the Northern Pacific Railway, built the route. And by 1951, it was also in use by the Union Pacific and Great Northern Railway. By 1968, the Chicago, Milwaukee, St. Paul and Pacific Railroad had also been given usage rights, but as of 2008, the BNSF Railway (the corporate descendant of the Northern Pacific and Great Northern Railways) uses the railroad. The PH No. 10 Road intersection west of Castle Rock was the busiest segment of the Castle Rock to Vader route of SR 411 in 1970, with an estimated daily average of 2,350 motorists. The intersection was also the busiest segment in 1991, with an estimated daily average of 4,150 motorists.

Spur route

The busiest segment of the street is the SR 411 intersection, with an estimated daily average of 15,000 motorists in 2007. In 1970, the SR 4 intersection was the busiest, with an estimated daily average of 2,850 motorists.

Major intersections

See also

References

External links

Highways of Washington State

411
Transportation in Cowlitz County, Washington